Diving was contested from March 10 to March 11 at the 1951 Asian Games in National Stadium Swimming Pool, New Delhi, India. Only two countries entered the competition. The host nation India won both gold medals, Iran finished second in medal table by winning one silver and one bronze.

Medalists

Medal table

Participating nations
A total of 5 athletes from 2 nations competed in diving at the 1951 Asian Games:

References

External links
 Results
Report of the first Asian Games held at New Delhi

1951 Asian Games events
1951
Asian Games
1951 Asian Games